Marco Liserre is a University Professor in electrical engineering currently Head of the Chair of Power Electronics at the University of Kiel in Kiel, Germany. He was named a Fellow of the Institute of Electrical and Electronics Engineers (IEEE) in 2013. He is Deputy Director of Fraunhofer ISIT and Founder of ISIT@CAU, 2022.

Biography 
Prof. Liserre received his MSc and PhD degrees in 1998 and 2002, respectively from Bari Polytechnic in Electrical Engineering. He served as an Associate Professor there at Bari Polytechnic and from 2012, he was a Professor in reliable power electronics at Aalborg University Denmark. From September 16, 2013, he is full professor and head of the Chair of Power Electronics, Kiel University, Kiel, Germany. He has published several technical papers and patented some of his major scientific contributions. He also published a book in the area of grid connected power electronic converters titled "Grid Converters for Photovoltaic and Wind Power Systems". He is listed in ISI Thomson report "The world's most influential scientific minds" from 2014. He has been awarded with an ERC Consolidator Grant for the project "The Highly Efficient And Reliable smart Transformer (HEART), a new Heart for the Electric Distribution System". He is the founder and convenor of the CIGRE Working Group "Power electronics-based transformer technology, design, grid integration and services provision to the distribution grid".

Awards and recognition 
He has been awarded with IEEE PES Working Group Award for the technical report “Microgrid Stability Definitions, Analysis, and Examples". In addition, he has received several awards for his contribution and the most prestigious among them being IEEE Mittelmann Achievement Award in 2018. He is in the list of highly cited researcher in the field of engineering since 2014.

Roles and responsibilities 
Throughout the career, Prof. Liserre has taken many roles and responsibilities, and some of the major roles and responsibilities are:

 Chairman of the IEEE Standard Committee on Power Electronics Transformer
 Member of 2022 IEEE Nikola Tesla Award Committee 
 Member of 2022 IEEE Richard Harold Kaufmann Award Committee
 Convenor and Founder of the CIGRE Working Group "Power electronics-based transformer technology, design, grid integration and services provision to the distribution grid"
 Chairman of the IEEE PELS Technical Committee on Electronic Power Grid System
 Member of scientific advisory board in Kopernikus-project ENSURE
 Member of the Program committee of the DFG Priority Program “Energieeffiziente Leistungselektronik, GaNius” 2020, 6 years initiative
 Co-Editor-in-Chief of IEEE Open Journal of Power Electronics from 2019
 Co-Editor-in-Chief of IEEE Transactions on Industrial Electronics, 2017-2019
 Co-Editor-in-Chief of IEEE Transactions on Industrial Informatics, 2014-2016
 Founding Editor-in-Chief of IEEE Industrial Electronics Magazine, 2007-2009
 Organizer of Powertech 2025 Conference, IEEE PES, Kiel.
 Organizer of PEDG 2022 Conference, IEEE PELS, Kiel. 
 Chairman of eGrid 2021 Workshop, IEEE PES and PELS, digital.
 Chairman of the IEEE-ISIE 2010, 4-7 July 2010, Bari, Italy. In 2010 ISIE has been the largest conference of the Industrial Electronics Society, with 700 participants and 635 papers that were presented and published. 
 Co-Chairman of CPE-POWERNEG 2019, Sonderborg, Denmark.

Invited presentations 
Prof. Liserre has given several invited presentations as part of different technical events and the details are available in.

References 

Fellow Members of the IEEE
Italian engineers
Living people
Year of birth missing (living people)